Editan soup is a vegetable soup that originates from the Efik People of Cross River State in South South Nigeria. It is popularly known amongst the Cross River State people. The soup is made from Editan leaf, a bitter leaf. Before being cooked the bitterness must be squeezed out.

The editan leaf is believed to have medicinal values.

See also 
 Afang Soup
 Atama Soup
 Edikan Ikong
 Nigerian Cuisine
 List of Soups
 List of vegetable soups

References 

Nigerian cuisine
African soups
Vegetable soups